Jean Claude N'Guessan is an Ivorian judoka. He competed in the men's lightweight event at the 1984 Summer Olympics.

References

External links
 

Year of birth missing (living people)
Living people
Ivorian male judoka
Olympic judoka of Ivory Coast
Judoka at the 1984 Summer Olympics
Place of birth missing (living people)